Zinc molybdate is an inorganic compound with the formula ZnMoO4. It is used as a white pigment, which  that is also a corrosion inhibitor.  A related pigment is sodium zinc molybdate, Na2Zn(MoO4)2. The material has also been investigated as an electrode material.

In terms of its structure, the Mo(VI) centers are tetrahedral and the Zn(II) centers are octahedral.

Safety
The LD50 (oral, rats) is 11,500 mg/kg. While highly soluble molybdates like e.g. sodium molybdate are toxic in higher doses, zinc molybdate is essentially non-toxic because of its insolubility in water. Molybdates possess a lower toxicity than chromates or lead salts and are therefore seen as an alternative to these salts for corrosion inhibition.

References

External links
Improved corrosion-inhibiting pigments

zinc
molybdate